Norman Jefferson Jr. (born August 7, 1964) is a former cornerback in the National Football League (NFL). He was selected in the 1987 NFL draft by the Green Bay Packers. He was the last player taken, making him Mr. Irrelevant of the 1987 NFL draft. He played two seasons with the Packers. Jefferson played college football at Louisiana State University for the LSU Tigers. He was born in Marrero, Louisiana and attended John Ehret High School.

References

People from Marrero, Louisiana
Green Bay Packers players
American football defensive backs
LSU Tigers football players
Players of American football from Louisiana
1964 births
Living people